This list of extinct animals of the Netherlands includes the animal species and subspecies once lived in the Netherlands but have disappeared since human habitation.
This list features the mammals, birds, fish, molluscs, butterflies, dragonflies, bees, pond damselflies, mayflies, grasshoppers and crickets that have disappeared from the Netherlands. There have been no known extinctions of reptiles or amphibians in the Netherlands.

Most animals on this list of extinct animals in the Netherlands survive in other places in the world. However, some of them are now globally extinct, like the great auk (Pinguinus impennis), the European wild horse (Equus ferus) and the aurochs (Bos primigenius primigenius). One skeleton of the great auk was excavated in a Roman settlement near Velsen. Bones were also found near Rotterdam. In the Netherlands there are no bone finds of the aurochs after the Roman period (400 AD). Phengaris alcon arenaria, an endemic Dutch subspecies of the Alcon blue butterfly became extinct at the end of the 1970s.

Fossilized remains of the gray whale (Eschrichtuis robustus), have been found dated to 340 BC, demonstrating that this species once roamed the North Sea, although it is no longer found there.  A lower jaw of a northern lynx (Lynx lynx lynx) was found at the remains of a Roman settlement near Valkenburg in the Netherlands. During excavations of sites dated to the Roman period (around 400 AD) on the Rhine delta there were findings of important breeding sites of the Dalmatian pelican (Pelecanus crispus).  According to the hunting rights of the bishops of Utrecht we know that brown bears (Ursus arctos arctos) were still found in the Netherlands as late as the eleventh century.  According to a hunting licence from Drenthe, elk (Alces alces alces) were also known to be in this country until 1025.  The North Atlantic right whale (Eubalaena glacialis), which once appeared from the Bay of Biscay to Norway, have disappeared from the waters around the Netherlands.  It is suspected that the last whales were killed at the end of the Middle Ages. However, there was an alleged sighting off Texel in 2005.

Mammals 
 Alces alces alces – European elk (1025)
 Barbastellus barbastellus – barbastelle bat
 Bos primigenius primigenius – Eurasian aurochs (400 AD)
 Equus ferus ferus – tarpan
 Lynx lynx lynx – Northern lynx (Roman period)
 Mustela lutreola – European mink (1887)
 Rhinolophus ferrumequinum – greater horseshoe bat (1974)
 Rhinolophus hipposideros – lesser horseshoe bat (1983)
 Ursus arctos arctos – Eurasian brown bear (eleventh century)

Birds 
 Pinguinus impennis – great auk – globally extinct
 Tringa glareola  – wood sandpiper (1939) – does not nest in the Netherlands any more, but they can be found during the migration season.

Fish 
 Alosa alosa – allis shad (1993)
 Alosa fallax – twaite shad (1970)
 Coregonus oxyrinchus – houting (1940)
 Hippocampus ramulosus – common seahorse
 Thymallus thymallus – grayling
 Salmo trutta fario – brown trout
 Syngnathus typhle – deepnosed pipefish

Molluscs 

 Pisidium tenuilineatum
 Rissoa membranacea
 Spermodea lamellata
 Unio crassus – thick shelled river mussel (1968)

Insects

Butterflies 
 Aporia crataegi
 Argynnis paphia
 Boloria euphrosyne
 Brenthis ino
 Coenonympha hero
 Cupido minimus minimus
 Euphydryas aurinia aurinia
 Lycaena hippothoe hippothoe
 Melitaea diamina
 Nymphalis antiopa
 Phengaris alcon arenaria (1979)
 Phengaris arion
 Phengaris nausithous
 Phengaris teleius
 Plebeius idas idas
 Polyommatus semiargus semiargus
 Thymelicus acteon acteon
 Spialia sertorius sertorius

Damselflies
 Nehalennia speciosa

Bees
 Ammobates punctatus
 Andrena curvungula
 Andrena marginata
 Andrena nitidiuscula
 Andrena pandellei
 Andrena schencki
 Andrena thoracica
 Anthidium byssinum
 Anthophora aestivalis
 Anthophora bimaculata
 Anthophora borealis
 Anthophora plagiata
 Biastes truncatus
 Bombus confusus
 Bombus cullumanus
 Bombus pomorum
 Bombus subterraneus
 Coelioxys alata
 Dufourea minuta
 Halictus eurygnathus
 Halictus quadricinctus
 Lasioglossum laeve
 Lasioglossum laevigatum
 Nomada argentata
 Nomada furva
 Nomada mutabilis
 Nomada obtusifrons
 Nomada piccioliana
 Nomada rhenana
 Nomada roberjeotiana
 Osmia anthocopoides
 Osmia papaveris
 Osmia xanthomela
 Rophites quinquespinosus
 Thyreus orbatus

Pond damselflies
 Holocentropus insignis
 Hydroptila cornuta
 Hydroptila dampfi
 Ithytrichia lamellaris
 Micrasemodes minimus
 Oligoplectrum maculatum
 Sericostoma flavicorne
 Setodes viridis
 Silo piceus

Grasshoppers and crickets
 Locusta migratoria
 Psophus stridulus

Stoneflies
 Euleuctra geniculata
 Isogenus nubecula
 Isoperla grammatica
 Isoptena serricornis
 Leuctra fusca
 Marthamea selysii
 Protonemura nitida
 Taeniopteryx nebulosa
 Xanthoperla apicalis

Mayflies
 Ametropus fragilis
 Choroterpes picteti
 Ecdyonurus affinis
 Ecdyonurus dispar
 Habroleptoides modesta
 Habrophlebia lauta
 Heptagenia coerulans
 Isonychia ignota
 Oligoneuriella rhenana
 Palingenia longicauda
 Potamanthus luteus
 Siphlonurus aestivalis
 Siphlonurus alternatus
 Siphlonurus lacustris

Reintroductions and rediscoveries

Mammals
 Castor fiber albicus – European beaver
The last known European beaver in the Netherlands was killed in 1826. In 1988 European beavers were reintroduced in the Biesbosch, and in 1994 beavers were released in the Gelderse Poort (a wilderness area between Arnhem and Nijmegen). The new beavers are doing very well; their numbers are increasing and they are spreading to other parts of the Netherlands.

 Canis lupus lupus – Eurasian wolf
ICUN lists the grey wolf as regionally extinct in the Netherlands. In March 2015, the first wolf in 100 years was sighted in the country. This was the first recorded, and second reported sighting following recent successful wolf reintroduction programs in neighboring Germany, with transient migrant wolves apparently occasionally crossing the border. Three wolve cubs were spotted on the Veluwe in June, 2019

 Cricetus cricetus canescens – European hamsters
Under orders from the Dutch Government, in 1999 the Das&Boom Foundation caught all the remaining European hamsters in the Netherlands. These animals were placed in a breeding programme in Diergaarde Blijdorp (Rotterdam Zoo). They were extinct in the wild, but offspring from the breeding programme have been reintroduced in a hamster reserve in Sibbe in the southern province of Limburg. In 2003 more hamsters were released in a second hamster reserve in Amby, near Maastricht. These reintroductions were followed by four more reintroductions in Heer, Sittard, Puth and Koningsbosch. The wild hamster population has now grown to c. 600 burrows (December 2006).

 Felis silvestris silvestris – European wild cat
The wild cat probably became extinct in the Netherlands in Roman times. The first confirmed specimen in the Netherlands since that time was a dead cat found near Groenlanden in Gelderland, while another dead animal was found in 2002 near Vaals in South Limburg. The first living cat was caught near Heeze, North Brabant in 2004. In 2006 a wild cat was caught on camera near Vaals. These few sightings are not yet positive proof of the wildcat settling in the Netherlands, but the known range of the wildcat has been approaching the Dutch borders since the 1990s.

 Lutra lutra – European otter
The last lonely otter in the Netherlands was killed by a car on 17 September 1988 in the neighbourhood of Joure (Province of Friesland). The first otters were reintroduced in National Park De Weerribben (Province of Overijssel) on 8 July 2002. By 2012 they had been released in other parts of the Netherlands as well.

 Phocoena phocoena – harbour porpoise
The twentieth century saw the taming of the Zuiderzee as a large enclosure dam (the Afsluitdijk) was constructed. Completed in 1932, the Zuiderzee became the IJsselmeer and large areas of water could be reclaimed for farming and housing. After this the harbour porpoise, together with the bottlenose dolphin, disappeared from the waters around the Netherlands. They came back in the 1980s.

Birds
 Ciconia ciconia – white stork
Once these birds were very common in the Netherlands, but their number decreased fast in the twentieth century. 1891 was the first year that no white stork bred in the Netherlands. A conservation and reintroduction program that started in 1967 resulted in 396 pairs in 2000.

 Egretta garzetta garzetta – little egret
This bird became extinct in the Netherlands in the nineteenth century, due to overhunting because of their feathers which were used in the hat industry. In 1979 this bird first bred again in the Oostvaardersplassen nature reserve. The second time this bird bred again in the Netherlands was in 1994. After that year it bred yearly in the Netherlands. Their numbers are still increasing.

 Grus grus – common crane
In 2001, one common crane pair bred successfully after 250 years in the Fochteloërveen, a nature reserve on the border of the provinces of Friesland and Drente. Before 2001 the common crane could only be found during the migration period.

 Porzana pusilla intermedia – Baillon's crake
This bird was considered extinct in the Netherlands after it was last sighted breeding in 1972. In early 2005 five territorial and two breeding pairs were located again in the province of Utrecht.

Fish
 Salmo salar – Atlantic salmon
The Atlantic salmon was very common in the Netherlands in the seventeenth century, but disappeared when the rivers were tamed and closed by the Dutch to protect their land. The salmon could not reach their breeding ground in the rivers Rhine and Meuse. A reintroduction program resulted in salmon in the IJsselmeer and the river Rhine.

Dragonflies
 Coenagrion armatum – Norfolk damselfly
In 1956 this damselfly was thought to be extinct in the Netherlands, but was rediscovered in the National Park De Weerribben on 9 May 1999.

 Coenagrion mercuriale – southern damselfly
Was last seen in 1953, but was rediscovered in Limburg in 2011.

Grasshoppers
 Tetrix bipunctata
Tetrix bipunctata is a species of pygmy locust that was not recorded between 1975 and 2011. Therefore, it was listed as being 'extinct' on the Dutch Red List (Rode Lijst) in 1999.

See also
 List of extinct animals of Europe
 List of molluscs recorded in the Netherlands

References

External links
 Dutch Ministry of Agriculture, Nature and Food Quality

Netherlands
Netherlands
Animals, extinct
Animals, extinct